Myoporum sandwicense, commonly known as naio, bastard sandalwood or  false sandalwood is a species of flowering plant in the figwort family, Scrophulariaceae. It is a tree or shrub highly variable in its form, the size and shape of its leaves, in the number of flowers in a group and in the shape of its fruit. It is endemic to Hawaii.

Description
Myoporum sandwicense grows as either a small tree, large tree, or dwarf shrub, depending on the elevation and conditions. At the tree line, naio grows as a  shrub. The bark on older specimens is often dark, rough and furrowed.

They are a tubular bell shape with a fragrant odor and there are 5 lance-shaped sepals and 5 petals forming the tube. The fruit usually dry out and remain attached to the branch.

Taxonomy
Myoporum sandwicense was first formally described in 1866 by Asa Gray and the description was published in Proceedings of the American Academy of Arts and Sciences. The specific epithet  sandwicense refers to the Sandwich Islands, the name given by James Cook to the Hawaiian Islands, where the type specimen was collected.

There are two subspecies:
Myoporum sandwicense  A.Gray  subsp. sandwicense which occurs on all the Hawaiian Islands and has fruit which is oval to almost spherical;
Myoporum sandwicense subsp. lanaiensis  (G.L.Webster) Chinnock  which is only found on Lanai and has fruit which is cone-shaped to lens-shaped.

In 1951 Grady Webster included a form found in the Cook Islands as Myoporum sandwicense subsp. wilderi but it is now known as Myoporum wilderi Skottsb. 

Some sources describe varieties including degeneri Webster, fauriei (Levl.) Kraenzlin,  st.-johnii Webster, and stellatum Webster. In addition, a prostrate, shrubby variety known as naio papa ("flat naio") grows only at South Point on the island of Hawaii and is characterized by its similarities to creeping shrubs.

Distribution and habitat
The distribution of M. sandwicense in the United States is limited to the state of Hawaii. Naio can be found in a variety of habitats, including low shrublands, dry forests, mesic forests, and wet forests, but is most common in subalpine shrublands.

Uses

Indigenous uses
The finely-textured wood of M. sandwicense is hard and has a specific gravity of 0.55.  Native Hawaiians, who called the wood aaka, used it to make manu (bow and stern
ornamental end pieces) and pale (gunwales) for waa (outrigger canoes), pou (house posts), haha ka upena (fishing net spacers), and lamalama (long-burning torches for night fishing). The oily wood was also used as a substitute for iliahi (Santalum spp.) due to the similarity in smell when burned.

Horticulture
M. sandwicense can be cultivated using seeds separated from the fruit - the average germination time varies by reports but is most commonly noted as taking between six and eighteen months. Propagation by cuttings and air layering is also possible.

Other uses
For a short time in the 19th century after most Iliahi (Santalum freycinetianum) had been harvested, naio was exported to China, where it was made into incense and burned in Joss houses.

References

External links

Myoporum sandwicense (naio) information from the Hawaiian Ecosystems at Risk project (HEAR)
Myoporum sandwicense (naio) images from Forest & Kim Starr

sandwicense
Endemic flora of Hawaii
Trees of Hawaii
Biota of Hawaii (island)
Biota of Kauai
Biota of Maui
Biota of Molokai
Biota of Oahu